Clayton Floyd (born 7 August 1996) is a Dutch-South African cricketer. In September 2019, he was named in the Netherlands' Twenty20 International (T20I) squad for the 2019–20 Ireland Tri-Nation Series. He made his T20I debut for the Netherlands, against Scotland, on 16 September 2019. In April 2020, he was one of seventeen Dutch-based cricketers to be named in the team's senior squad.

In November 2021, Floyd was named in the Dutch One Day International (ODI) squad for their series against South Africa. In January 2022, Floyd was named in the Dutch ODI squad for their series against Afghanistan in Qatar. He made his ODI debut on 25 January 2022, for the Netherlands against Afghanistan.

References

External links
 

1996 births
Living people
South African cricketers
Dutch cricketers
Netherlands One Day International cricketers
Netherlands Twenty20 International cricketers
Place of birth missing (living people)
Dutch people of South African descent
Dutch sportspeople of African descent
South African emigrants to the Netherlands